Lime Ridge or Limeridge may refer to:

Canada
Lime Ridge Mall, Hamilton, Ontario
Limeridge Road (Hamilton, Ontario)

United States

Settlements
Lime Ridge, Pennsylvania
Lime Ridge, Wisconsin

Geographic features
A prominent foothill ridge of Mount Diablo in California
An anticline in Utah forming part of the Monument Upwarp

See also
 Lime Creek (disambiguation)
 Lime (disambiguation)